{{Infobox person
| name               = Martine Croxall
| honorific_suffix   = FRGS
| image              = 
| image_size         = 
| caption            = 
| birthname          = Martine Sarah Croxall
| birth_date         = 
| birth_place        = Hinckley, Leicestershire, England
| death_date         = 
| death_place        = 
| education          = Bablake School  University of Leeds
| occupation         = Journalist, news presenter
| alias              = 
| status             = 
| title              = 
| family             = 
| children           = 
| relatives          = 
| years_active       = 1991–present
| credits            = BBC News ChannelBBC Weekend NewsBBC World News BBC News at NineWorld News TodayBBC News at FiveBBC News at One
| agent              = 
}}

Martine Sarah Croxall  (born 23 February 1969) is a British television journalist. She was one of the main news presenters on BBC News.

Education
Martine Sarah Croxall was born on 23 February 1969 and grew up in Stoke Golding, a village in the Hinckley and Bosworth district of Leicestershire, England, where her father ran Croxall Hosiery. She attended the independent Bablake School in Coventry and studied Geography at the University of Leeds, gaining her BA in 1990.

Career
Croxall began with the BBC on work experience at BBC Radio Leicester in 1991. She followed this working at East Midlands Today, the BBC regional news programme for the region. She has also worked at Newsroom South East (1997) and UK Today.

She is a regular news presenter on BBC News between 18:30 and midnight, alternate Thursdays, FridaySunday. She occasionally hosts Afternoon Live on BBC News and has presented on both BBC World News and World News Today.

Croxall was the BBC's main presenter during the November 2015 Paris attacks. Her presentation was subsequently praised by David Henderson.

She was presenting BBC News on 9 April 2021, when the news broke of the death of Prince Philip, Duke of Edinburgh. Her delivery was praised for its professionalism and tone.

On 21 May 2021, Croxall presented Dateline London for the first time. Since 2017 Croxall has presented BBC Weekend News lunchtime edition. On 19 June 2021 Croxall presented BBC Weekend News evening and late bulletins for the first time. On 1 September 2021, Croxall presented BBC News at One for the first time.

In March 2022, Croxall won an episode of Celebrity Mastermind''; her specialist subject was American investigative journalist Nellie Bly.

Croxall was taken off air for 11 days and found to have breached impartiality rules for comments made introducing the BBC News channel's "The Papers" newspaper review on 23 October. Following the sudden news that Boris Johnson had withdrawn from contesting the Conservative Party leadership, Croxall declared that it was "all very exciting" and asked if she was "allowed to be this gleeful", before remarking that their review of tomorrow's papers would be difficult as they were being hastily rewritten. The BBC concluded that Croxall's "remarks and reactions... caused a significant risk the audience could believe opinions were being expressed on the Conservative leadership contest."

On February 2 2023, it was confirmed that Croxall – alongside many other presenters of the domestic BBC News Channel – would lose their presenting roles as part of the BBC's relaunched news channel.

Personal life
Croxall lives in St Albans, Hertfordshire.

She is a Fellow of the Royal Geographical Society.

References

External links
 

1969 births
Living people
20th-century British journalists
21st-century British journalists
Alumni of the University of Leeds
BBC newsreaders and journalists
BBC World News
British women television journalists
Fellows of the Royal Geographical Society
People educated at Bablake School
People from Hinckley
People from St Albans
Television personalities from Leicestershire